Charles Potter may refer to:
Charles E. Potter (1916–1979), U.S. Representative and Senator from Michigan
Charles Potter (philosopher) (1634–1663), English philosopher
Charles Potter (entomologist) (1907–1989), English entomologist
Charles Francis Potter (1885–1962), American Unitarian minister, theologian and author
Tommy Potter (Charles Thomas Potter, 1918–1988), jazz double bass player
Charles Brandon Potter (born 1982), American voice actor, ADR director, and script writer
Chuck Potter, character in The Rage: Carrie 2
Charles Potter Jr., American politician and member of the Delaware House of Representatives
Charles N. Potter (1852–1927), Justice of the Wyoming Supreme Court
Charles Potter (cricketer) (1851–1895), English cricketer